Anssi Nieminen is a Finnish former ski jumper.

References

External links

Living people
Finnish male ski jumpers
Year of birth missing (living people)
Sportspeople from Jyväskylä
20th-century Finnish people